The big-line-big-clique conjecture is an unsolved problem in discrete geometry, stating that finite sets of many points in the Euclidean plane either have many collinear points, or they have many points that are all mutually visible to each other (no third point blocks any two of them from seeing each other). More precisely, for every positive integers  and  there should exist another number , such that every set of  points contains  collinear points (a "big line"),  mutually-visible points (a "big clique"), or both.

The big-line-big-clique conjecture was posed by Jan Kára, Attila Pór, and David R. Wood in a 2005 publication. It has led to much additional research on point-to-point visibility in point sets.

Partial results

Generalizing the integer lattice example, projecting a -dimensional system of lattice points of size 
onto the plane, using a generic linear projection, produces a set of points with no  collinear points and no  mutually visible points.

Related problems
The visibilities among any system of points can be analyzed by using the visibility graph of the points, a graph that has the points as vertices and that connects two points by an edge whenever the line segment connecting them is disjoint from the other points. The "big cliques" of the big-line-big-clique conjecture are cliques in the visibility graph. However, although a system of points that is entirely collinear can be characterized by having a bipartite visibility graph, this characterization does not extend to subsets of points: a subset can have a bipartite induced subgraph of the visibility graph without being collinear.

According to the solution of the happy ending problem, every subset of points with no three in line includes a large subset forming the vertices of a convex polygon. More generally, it can be proven using the same methods that every set of sufficiently many points either includes  collinear points or  points in convex position. However, some of these pairs of convex points could be blocked from visibility by points within the convex polygon they form.

Another related question asks whether points in general position (or with no lines of more than some given number of points) contain the vertices of an empty convex polygon or hole. This is a polygon whose vertices belong to the point set, but that has no other points in the intersection of the point set with its convex hull. If a hole of a given size exists, its vertices all necessarily see each other. All sufficiently large sets of points in general position contain five vertices forming an empty pentagon or hexagon, but there exist arbitrarily large sets in general position with no empty heptagons.

A strengthening of the big line big clique conjecture asks for the big clique to be a "visible island", a set of points that are mutually visible and that are formed from the given larger point set by intersecting it with a convex set. However, this strengthened version is false: if a point set in general position has no empty heptagon, then replacing each of its points by a closely-spaced triple of collinear points produces a point set with no four in a line and with no visible islands of 13 or more points.

There is no possibility of an infinitary version of the same conjecture: Pór and Wood found examples of countable sets of points with no four points on a line and with no triangle of mutually visible points.

References

Conjectures
Discrete geometry